The Bab-el-Mandeb (Arabic: ,), or the Gate of Grief, is a strait between Yemen on the Arabian Peninsula, and Djibouti and Eritrea in the Horn of Africa. It connects the Red Sea to the Gulf of Aden.

Name

The strait derives its name from the dangers attending its navigation or, according to an Arab legend, from the numbers who were drowned by an earthquake that separated the Arabian Peninsula from the Horn of Africa.

In "Bab-el-Mandeb", "Bab" refers to "gate" while "Mandeb" refers to "lamentation" or "grief".

Geography
The Bab-el-Mandeb acts as a strategic link between the Indian Ocean and the Mediterranean Sea via the Red Sea and the Suez Canal. In 2006, an estimated  of oil passed through the strait per day, out of a world total of about  moved by tankers.

Near the coast of Djibouti lies a group of smaller islands known as the "Seven Brothers". There is a surface current inwards in the eastern channel, but a strong undercurrent outwards in the western channel.

History

Paleo-environmental and tectonic events in the Miocene epoch created the Danakil Isthmus, a land bridge forming a broad connection between Yemen and Ethiopia. During the last 100,000 years, eustatic sea level fluctuations have led to alternate opening and closing of the straits. According to the recent single origin hypothesis, the straits of Bab-el-Mandeb were probably witness to the earliest migrations of modern humans. It is presumed that the oceans were then much lower and the straits were much shallower or dry, which allowed a series of emigrations along the southern coast of Asia.

According to Ethiopian Orthodox Tewahedo Church tradition, the straits of Bab-el-Mandeb were witness to the earliest migrations of Semitic Ge'ez speakers into Africa, occurring  BC, roughly around the same time as the Hebrew patriarch Jacob. The Kingdom of Aksum was a major regional power in the Horn of Africa. It extended its rule across the strait with the conquest of the Himyarite Kingdom shortly before the rise of Islam.

The British East India Company unilaterally seized the island of Perim in 1799 on behalf of its Indian empire. The government of Britain asserted its ownership in 1857 and erected a lighthouse there in 1861, using it to command the Red Sea and the trade routes through the Suez Canal. It was used as a coaling station to refuel steamships until 1935 when the reduced use of coal as fuel rendered the operation unprofitable.

The British presence continued until 1967 when the island became part of the People's Republic of South Yemen. Before the handover, the British government had put forward before the United Nations a proposal for the island to be internationalized as a way to ensure the continued security of passage and navigation in the Bab-el-Mandeb, but this was refused.

In 2008 a company owned by Tarek bin Laden unveiled plans to build a bridge named Bridge of the Horns across the strait, linking Yemen with Djibouti. Middle East Development LLC issued a notice to construct a bridge passing across the Red Sea that would be the longest suspended passing in the world. The project was assigned to engineering company COWI in collaboration with architect studio Dissing+Weitling, both from Denmark. It was announced in 2010 that Phase 1 had been delayed; however, as of mid-2016, nothing more has been heard about the project.

Sub-region
The Bab-el-Mandeb is also a sub-region in the Arab League, which includes Djibouti, Yemen, and Eritrea.

Demographics

Population centers
The most significant towns and cities along both the Djiboutian and Yemeni sides of the Bab-el-Mandeb:

Djibouti
 Khôr ʽAngar
 Moulhoule
 Fagal

Yemen
 At Turbah
 Cheikh Saïd

See also
Bridge of the Horns
Strait:
Red Sea Dam

Region:
Horn of Africa
Mashriq

References

External links

 
 Notice-to-Proceed Launches Ambitious Red Sea Crossing
 Sea crossing

 
Straits of Asia
Straits of Africa
Straits of the Indian Ocean
Arabian mythology
Bodies of water of Yemen
Bodies of water of Djibouti
Bodies of water of the Red Sea
Gulf of Aden
Borders of Yemen
Borders of Djibouti
Borders of Eritrea
International straits
Djibouti–Eritrea border